The Communications Secretary of Pakistan is the Federal Secretary for the Ministry of Communications. The position holder is a BPS-22 grade officer, usually belonging to the Pakistan Administrative Service. The Secretary heads the Ministry that is the central  administrative authority on communications and transport sector in Pakistan. Notable organisations that come under the purview of the Communications Secretary includes the National Highway Authority (NHA) and the National Highways & Motorway Police (NH&MP). The incumbent Federal Secretary for Communications is Zafar Hassan.

See also
Government of Pakistan
Federal Secretary
Maritime Secretary of Pakistan
Cabinet Secretary of Pakistan
Finance Secretary of Pakistan
Petroleum Secretary of Pakistan

References

Ministry of Communications (Pakistan)